Circuit Ricardo Tormo, also known as Circuit de Valencia and officially named Circuit de la Comunitat Valenciana Ricardo Tormo, is a  motorsport race track located in Cheste (Valencian Community, Spain) and built in 1999. The track is named after Spanish, two-time world champion Grand Prix motorcycle racer Ricardo Tormo (1952–1998), who died in 1998 of leukemia.

The track hosts the MotoGP Valencian Community Grand Prix. Also, the FIA GT Championship had a race there in 2000 and 2004, the World Touring Car Championship from 2005 to 2012, the European Le Mans Series in 2007, and the DTM from 2010 to 2012. It has also been Formula E's pre-season test venue since the 2017–18 season, having moved from Donington Park, with the circuit also considered a replacement venue for the 2019–20 season because of the COVID-19 crisis cancelling numerous rounds. It was also the GP3 Series (now FIA Formula 3 Championship) pre-season test venue until the 2017 season. The series also hosted a one-off event at the track in 2013. The GP2 Series (now FIA Formula 2 Championship) also held rounds at the track in 2006 and 2007. Valencia has also hosted the season-opening round of the NASCAR Whelen Euro Series since 2014.

Formula E

The circuit has been used by Formula E as a pre-season testing venue since 2017. On 28 January 2021, it was announced that the circuit would host the Valencia ePrix as the 5th and 6th round of the 2020–21 Formula E World Championship, to be held on 24 April 2021, replacing the cancelled Paris ePrix. It was the first time an ePrix has been held on a permanent race circuit, albeit on a unique configuration. One of the differences between the normal track for pre-season testing and the track used for the race was the installation of a temporary chicane in the start/finish straight. The track then turns right immediately after the exit of turn 8.

In other media
The track has been recreated in the videogames Tourist Trophy and Gran Turismo PSP. The track also appears in other video games like Alfa Romeo Racing Italiano, GTR Evolution and rFactor as well. As it is a MotoGP round host, the track has appeared in every MotoGP game since its début in 1999. The latest recreation of the track was in MotoGP 20, and the SBK games during 2006–2013.

Layout configurations

Lap records

Anthony Davidson holds the unofficial lap record, set in 2006 while testing a Honda RA106, with a time of 1:08.540sec. As of February 2023, the fastest official race lap records at the Circuit Ricardo Tormo are listed as:

Events

 Current

 January: Porsche Sprint Challenge Southern Europe
 February: Formula Winter Series, GT Winter Series
 March: Ferrari Challenge Europe
 May: NASCAR Whelen Euro Series NASCAR GP Spain – Valencia NASCAR Fest, F1 Academy, FIM CEV Moto3 Junior World Championship, FIM CEV Moto2 European Championship, European Talent Cup, Campeonato de España de Superbike
 September: GT World Challenge Europe, GT2 European Series, Lamborghini Super Trofeo Europe, Renault Clio Cup Europe, Campeonato de España de Resistencia
 October: Eurocup-3, F4 Spanish Championship
 November: Grand Prix motorcycle racing Valencian Community motorcycle Grand Prix, FIM CEV Moto3 Junior World Championship, FIM CEV Moto2 European Championship, European Talent Cup

 Future

 FIA Motorsport Games (2024)

 Former

 Auto GP (2001, 2008–2009, 2011–2012)
 Deutsche Tourenwagen Masters (2010–2012)
 European Touring Car Championship (2004)
 European Truck Racing Championship (2001, 2015)
 FIA GT Championship (2000, 2004)
 Formula 3 Euro Series (2010–2012)
 Formula E Valencia ePrix (2021)
 Formula Regional European Championship (2021)
 Formula Renault Eurocup (2004-2005)
 French F4 Championship (2022)
 GP2 Series (2006–2007)
 GP3 Series (2013)
 Grand Prix motorcycle racing European motorcycle Grand Prix (2020)
 International GT Open (2006–2008, 2010)
 Le Mans Series 1000 km Valencia (2007)
 MotoE World Cup Valencia eRace (2019)
 Sidecar World Championship (2000–2003)
 Superbike World Championship (2000–2010)
 TCR International Series (2015)
 World Touring Car Championship FIA WTCC Race of Spain (2005–2012)

Notes

References

External links

{
Official Page tickets MotoGp Circuit Comunidad Valenciana
Trackpedia's guide to driving the Circuit de Valencia

Superbike World Championship circuits
Motorsport venues in the Valencian Community
Sports venues in the Valencian Community
Valencian Community motorcycle Grand Prix
Valencia
Valencia
Valencia